United Nations Security Council resolution 1356, adopted unanimously on 19 June 2001, after reaffirming resolutions 733 (1992) and 751 (1992) on the situation in Somalia, the council exempted non-lethal military equipment from the arms embargo against the country.

The security council expressed its desire for peace and security in Somalia and recognised efforts by humanitarian relief organisations and the United Nations in the country.

Acting under Chapter VII of the United Nations Charter, the council called upon all countries to comply with restrictions against Somalia. It decided that protective clothing such as flak jackets and military helmets for use by United Nations, humanitarian or media personnel would be exempt from the sanctions in addition to non-lethal military equipment approved by the committee established in Resolution 751.

See also
 List of United Nations Security Council Resolutions 1301 to 1400 (2000–2002)
 Somali Civil War

References

External links
 
Text of the Resolution at undocs.org

 1356
 1356
2001 in Somalia
June 2001 events